Krishna Prasad Bhattarai, professionally known as Krishna Dharabasi is a Nepali writer, novelist and literary critic. He has written multiple essays, short stories, poems and novels. He won the Madan Puraskar for his novel Radha in 2005 (2062 BS). Jhola, one of his short stories has been adapted into a film of the same title. He is known for using meta-writing style (Leela lekhan) in his fictional works.

Biography 
He was born on 17 July 1960 (2 Shrawan 2017 BS), to father Tikaram Bhattarai and mother Ambika Bhattarai in Ambarpur village of Panchthar district. He is the eldest child and has four sisters and a brother.

He began his literary career by publishing a poem in Suryodaya weekly newspaper. He worked in Agricultural Development Bank for 25 years. After retiring from his bank job, he dedicated his time for writing. Saranarthi, his debut novel was published in 1991.

Bibliography
Balak Harayeko Suchana (Essays collection,1991)
Bishweshwar Prasad Koiralaka Upanyas (Literary criticism)
Unmuktika Aawajharu (Poetry collection)
Lilalekhan (Literary criticism)
Nari Bhitra Testo K Chha Hajur (Essays collection)
Uttam Jung Sijapatiko Aalu (Essays collection)
Saranarthi (Novel, 1991)
Adha Bato (Novel, 2002)
Jhola (Short story collection, 2003)
Pathakko Adalatma (Essay)
Kaanchi Radha (Short epic, 2005)
Radha (Novel, 2005)
Tesro Aayam ra Bairagi Kainla (Literary criticism)
Tapai (Essays collection)
Mero Sahitik Yatra ra Madan Purskar (Memoir)
Pandulipi (Novel)
Tundal (Novel)
Aama (Short story collection)
Gestapo
Lilabodh (Literary criticism)

Personal life 
His first wife Sita Pokharel died in 2010. He married Manju Bimali in 2012.

See also 

 Bairagi Kainla
 Madan Mani Dixit
 Ishwor Ballav

References

Living people
Nepalese male novelists
Madan Puraskar winners
21st-century Nepalese screenwriters
1960 births
People from Panchthar District
21st-century Nepalese writers
Nepalese male writers
Nepali-language writers from Nepal